In the United States, divided government describes a situation in which one party controls the White House (executive branch), while another party controls one or both houses of the United States Congress (legislative branch). Divided government is seen by different groups as a benefit or as an undesirable product of the model of governance used in the U.S. political system. Under said model, known as the separation of powers, the state is divided into different branches. Each branch has separate and independent powers and areas of responsibility so that the powers of one branch are not in conflict with the powers associated with the others. The degree to which the president of the United States has control of Congress often determines their political strength, such as the ability to pass sponsored legislation, ratify treaties, and have Cabinet members and judges approved. Early in the 19th century, divided government was rare but since the 1970s it has become increasingly common.

The model can be contrasted with the fusion of powers in a parliamentary system where the executive and legislature (and sometimes parts of the judiciary) are unified. Those in favor of divided government believe that such separations encourage more policing of those in power by the opposition, as well as limiting spending and the expansion of undesirable laws. Opponents, however, argue that divided governments become lethargic, leading to many gridlocks. In the late 1980s, Terry M. Moe, a professor of political science at Stanford University, examined the issue. He concluded that divided governments lead to compromise which can be seen as beneficial, but he also noticed that divided governments subvert performance and politicize the decisions of executive agencies. Additionally, further research has shown that during divided governments, legislatures will pass laws with sunset provisions in order to achieve a political consensus.

Party control of legislative and executive branches

List 
Key

D denotes the Democratic Party, R denotes the Republican Party.
Bold indicates a divided government.

Presidential impact
Many presidents' elections produced what is known as a coattail effect, in which the success of a presidential candidate also leads to electoral success for other members of his or her party. In fact, all newly elected presidents except Zachary Taylor, Richard Nixon, and George H. W. Bush were accompanied by control of at least one house of Congress.

Presidents by congressional control and terms
Most columns are in numbers of years.

See also
 Divided government
 Government trifectas in the United States
 Party divisions of United States Congresses
 Political party strength in U.S. states

Notes

References

Further reading
Ansolabehere, S., Palmer, M., & Schneer, B. (2018). Divided Government and Significant Legislation: A History of Congress from 1789 to 2010. Social Science History, 42(1), 81-108.
Morris Fiorina, Divided Government, 1996.
David R. Mayhew, Divided We Govern, 1991.

Political science terminology
Federal government of the United States